The Guy Walter Stakes, registered as the Wiggle Stakes,  is an Australian Turf Club Group 2 Thoroughbred horse race, for mares aged four-years-old and upwards, over a distance of 1400 metres at Randwick Racecourse in Sydney, Australia in late February or early March.  Total prize money for the race is A$250,000.

History
The Registered Race is named after champion mare Wiggle, who was a champion two-year-old and three-year-old (1958–59) and also later went on to win in the USA.

The current race name is named after the trainer Guy Walter (1954–2014), who trained 36 Group One winners and his horses won more than 120 stakes races for around $40 million in prize money.

Name
 1996–1999 - Wiggle Quality Handicap
 2000–2004 - Wiggle Fillies and Mares Quality Handicap
 2005–2011 - Wiggle Quality Handicap
 2012–2014 - Wiggle Stakes
 2015 onwards - Guy Walter Stakes

Grade
1996–2013 - Listed race
2014–2015 - Group 3
2016 onwards - Group 2

Venue
 1996–2001 - Warwick Farm Racecourse 
 2002–2004 - Randwick Racecourse
 2005–2015 - Warwick Farm Racecourse
 2016 onwards - Randwick Racecourse

Conditions
 Prior to 2005 the race was for three year old fillies and older mares.
 From 2012 onwards the race has set weights with penalties conditions.

Winners

 2023 - Hope In Your Heart
 2022 - Forbidden Love
 2021 - Krone
2020 - Dawn Dawn
2019 - Alassio
2018 - Dixie Blossoms
2017 - Dixie Blossoms
2016 - Solicit 
2015 - Danesiri 
2014 - Catkins
2013 - Steps In Time  
2012 - Steps In Time 
2011 - Jersey Lily
2010 - Dane Julia 
2009 - Hot Danish 
2008 - Hot Danish  
2007 - Doubting  
2006 - Bhandara 
2005 - Danni Martine 
2004 - Gold Lottey  
2003 - Forum Floozie    
2002 - Youhadyourwarning     
2001 - Corelli   
2000 - Stella Maree 
1999 - Bonanova   
1998 - Sybeel 
1997 - Timeless Winds   
1996 - Destruct

See also
 List of Australian Group races
 Group races

External links 
First three placegetters Wiggle Stakes (The Guy Walter ATC)

References

Horse races in Australia